Mugamba is a natural region in the Bururi Province of Burundi. The Rugo is a traditional Burundian house of the region. There is also a town named Mugamba in the Mugamba Commune located in the region.

Site description
Historic populations in this area have created shelters to protect themselves from the relatively low temperatures and high precipitation of this area.  The rugo, or traditional Burundian house or housing complex, of this area includes dwellings of all the members of the same family, and is surrounded by a bamboo fence.  The dimension of the house is determined by the size of a person lengthened on the ground, extending their right hand outward. A stake having to be used for the tracing of the diameter of the house is then fixed at the end of the finger (the major one). This dimension is function of the social status and the needs for the owner.

World Heritage Status

This site was added to the UNESCO World Heritage Tentative List on May 9, 2007 in the Cultural category.

Notes

References
Le rugo traditionnel du Mugamba - UNESCO World Heritage Centre Accessed 2009-02-24.

Populated places in Bururi Province
Buildings and structures in Burundi
Natural regions of Africa